Francisco Cuauhtémoc Frías Castro (born 1 September 1950) is a Mexican lawyer and politician affiliated with the Institutional Revolutionary Party (PRI). He served as a federal deputy of the LIX Legislature of the Mexican Congress representing Sinaloa, and previously served as a local deputy in the LVI Legislature of the Congress of Sinaloa.

References

1950 births
Living people
Politicians from Sinaloa
People from Los Mochis
20th-century Mexican lawyers
Institutional Revolutionary Party politicians
Members of the Congress of Sinaloa
Autonomous University of Sinaloa alumni
National Autonomous University of Mexico alumni
Academic staff of the National Autonomous University of Mexico
Academic staff of the Autonomous University of Tlaxcala
Heads of universities and colleges in Mexico
20th-century Mexican politicians
21st-century Mexican politicians
Members of the Chamber of Deputies (Mexico) for Sinaloa